The term "Wahhabi" has been widely invoked by external observers as a pejorative epithet to label a wide range of religious, social and political movements across the Muslim World, ever since the 18th century. Initially, the term "Wahhabiyya" was employed by the political opponents of the religious reform movement initiated by Muhammad Ibn 'Abd al-Wahhab (d. 1792 C.E/ 1206 A.H) in the Arabian Peninsula and continued by his successors. The term was derived from his father's name, 'Abd al-Wahhab and widely employed by rivals to denounce his movement. Meanwhile, Ibn 'Abd al-Wahhab and his disciples rejected the terminology and identified themselves as "Muwahhidun".

The term would later be popularised by the British empire to label numerous Islamic religious movements, of varying backgrounds, which they opposed. As early as the 19th century, the British empire had popularised the notion of an imaginary Wahhabi conspiracy which was portrayed as an imminent danger to Imperial security. Throughout these years, the term "Wahhabi" have been used as a as an Islamophobic as well as a sectarian epithet.  Various scholars have described the epithet as part of a "Rhetoric of Fear" to suppress alternate social, political and religious voices.

Historical usage

British India 
During the colonial era, various European travellers began using the term "Wahhabi" to  denote a wide swathe of Islamic reform and political movements they witnessed across the Muslim World. Hanafi scholar Fazl-e Haq Khairabadi, the fiercest opponent of Shah Ismail Dehlvi (d. 1831 C.E/ 1246 A.H) was the first major figure in South Asia to charge the socio-political Jihad movement of Sayyid Ahmad Shahid (d. 1831 C.E/ 1246 A.H) and Shah Ismail with "Wahhabism". Noting the shared Hejazi teachers of Islamic reformer Shah Waliullah Dehlawi (d. 1762 C.E/ 1176 A.H), the grandfather of Shah Ismail, with Muhammad Ibn 'Abd al-Wahhab; the colonial administration readily charged Waliullah's followers with "Wahhabism". After Sayyid Ahmad's death, his followers were labelled as "Wahhabis", accusing them of pan-Islamic rebellions and were persecuted in "The Great Wahhabi Trials" by the British. Meanwhile, the disciples of Sayyid Ahmad rejected this term and identified themselves as Ahl-i Hadith (Followers of Hadith), Tariqa-i Muhammadiyya (Path of Muhammad), etc. Prominent figures persecuted by the British include the Ahl-i Hadith and Deobandi leaders Siddiq Hasan Khan (d. 1890 C.E/ 1307 A.H), Muhammad Qasim Nanautvi (d. 1880 C.E/ 1297 A.H) etc. Decrying the chaotic state of affairs, prominent 19th century Indian modernist scholar Sir Syed Ahmad Khan (1817-1898) stated:"he who follows the sunnat [the teachings and practices of Muhammad] is called a Wahhabi and he who practices bidat [heretical innovations] is called wali [holy man]"

Islamic scholar Siddiq Hassan Khan would publicly challenge the rationale behind the British usage of the term "Wahhabi" and would compile several treatises rebuking its usage. Another influential Ahl-i Hadith scholar Muhammad Husayn Batalwi (d. 1920 C.E/ 1338 A.H) launched a popular protest campaign against the British administration during the 1880s to ban the official usage of the word "Wahhabi". In 1887, the Punjab provincial administration acceded to the campaign demands and by 1889, the movement was successful in procuring its demands throughout all the British Indian Provinces. Although the term "Wahhabi" would be censured in official documents, its usage continues in intra-religious discourse to the present day. Very often the Ahl-i Hadith, Deobandi and modernist movements were subjected to Takfir (excommunication) by rival sects; under the charge of "Wahhabism".

Contemporary usage

Russia 
As early as 1970s, the KGB had started a policy of anti-"Wahhabi" discourse, in co-operation with the traditional clergy, to target many indigenous Sufi reformers and political dissidents. In post-Soviet Russia, the term "Wahhabism" is commonly used to denote any manifestation of what the government determines as "non-traditional" Islam. Some Russian policymakers characterise "Wahhabism" as a "sectarian heresy" that is alien to Russian Islam. Other Russian intellectuals adopted an approach of differentiating between the Wahhabi movement of Saudi Arabia, which was characterised as "traditional", while its manifestation in foreign countries began to be termed "non-traditional". The latter approach came to be prescribed in the official Russian religious policy. In various provinces, "Wahhabism" would be banned by law. Revealing the government policy, Russian president Vladimir Putin stated in 2008:"Wahhabism in its original form is a normal tendency within Islam and there is nothing terrible in it. But there are extremist tendencies within Wahhabism itself"

Various Russian academics have challenged such portrayals of Wahhabism as a "catch-all phrase" that characterises trends that depart from normative Islam and warn of the disfiguring inferences of such an approach. These include Professor Vitaly Naumkin, Director of Islamic Studies Centre at the Russian Academy of Sciences, and author Aleksei Malashenko, who assert that:
 Wahhabi movement of Ibn 'Abd al-Wahhab was only one of the various Salafi movements and has different strands within itself
 Using the term "Wahhabism" suggests a monopolistic mentality that distinguishes between "true Islam" and a wrong version, eroding the ability to envision Islamic religious pluralism. This may also result in radicalisation of neo-traditionalist establishment which becomes hostile to Salafis, reformists and various Muslim groups they deem heterodox
 The term is abusive and has become increasingly used as a politically correct label to censure any political rivals. Oftentimes, many apolitical Muslims are the first victims of anti-Wahhabi campaigns

Central Asia 
Across Central Asia, authoritarian governments conceptualise "Wahhabism" to label various Islamic revivalist, social and political opposition movements and group them alongside militant Islamists. The political classes widely deploy the usage of the term "Wahhabism" to suppress any unauthorised religious activity. As a result, Sufi reformers, modernist intellectuals and various political activists have been targeted under the charge of "Wahhabism". Oftentimes, Iran-inspired shi'ite activists are also labelled "Wahhabi". In political  discourse, the "wrong" type of Islam is labelled as "fundamentalist" and "Wahhabi" and numerous arbitrary arrests, detentions and torture are meted out under the pretext of Wahhabism. In 1998, loudspeakers in Uzbek Mosques were banned, alleging that it was a "Wahhabi" practice.

Western usage 
In the Western world, before the 2000s, the term "Wahhabism" was mainly used in academic, scholarly circles in the context of Ibn 'Abd al-Wahhab's Muwahhidun movement and its historical evolution in the Arabian Peninsula. During the post-9/11 era, the term came to be used for a wide range of militant Islamist movements across the World in various media depictions.

References 

Islam-related slurs